Miquita Billie Alexandra Oliver (born 25 April 1984) is a British television presenter and radio personality. With Simon Amstell, she co-hosted Channel 4's Popworld from 2001 to 2006. Miquita then went on to present on T4 from 2006 to 2010, as well as having her own show, The Month With Miquita, on 4Music. She has also worked in radio, hosting shows on BBC Radio 1 and BBC Radio 1Xtra. In April/May 2015 she took part in a four-part series 24 Hours in the Past as herself.

Biography
Miquita was born in Paddington, London. Her mother is former Rip Rig + Panic singer and television presenter Andi Oliver, her father is Scottish and teaches art history. Miquita Oliver attended Holland Park School. In 2001, aged 16, she became presenter of the Channel 4 music show Popworld, co-presenting with Simon Amstell. The pair were known for employing a great deal of humour in interviews. They left the show in 2006, but Oliver continued to present the T4 strand.

Oliver and Amstell survived the 2004 Indian Ocean Tidal Wave while on holiday together in Thailand. She has since participated in disaster relief charity events.

After an incident in mid-2010 in which Oliver was overheard insulting singer Kesha behind her back by Kesha's management, Oliver was suspended from T4 for six weeks and subsequently her contract was not renewed. She recorded her last T4 in December 2010.

Oliver sang on The Slits' 2006 EP Revenge of the Killer Slits.

She has hosted shows on both BBC Radio 1 and BBC Radio 1Xtra, notably covering for Sara Cox and Spoony. She left her early morning show Oneclick to focus on TV projects. In an interview with Heat magazine, Oliver said that she was sacked from BBC Radio 1 following a comment she made in an interview with NME magazine about Fearne Cotton, calling her a "Devil Woman".

Oliver made a brief appearance in May 2007 on the BBC programme Neneh & Andi Dish It Up – presented by her mother Andi and "Auntie" Neneh Cherry – and has also made appearances on political talk show This Week, on 25 June 2009 and 17 December 2009. In March 2010 Oliver made a programme for Channel 4's T4 called Miquita's Oliver. She was set the challenge of starting a one-off urban production of the classic musical Oliver! from scratch. She had to cast it, script it and then direct it. The finished product was performed at the Hackney Empire to surprising critical acclaim.

Miquita Does series

In 2009, Oliver hosted a Miquita Does series:
"Miquita Does American Boys"
"Miquita Does All-Time Floorfillers"
"Miquita Does Number 1s"
"Miquita Does Movies"
"Miquita Does Pop"
"Miquita Does Power Ballads"
"Miquita Does Urban Anthems"

She then went on to have her own television show, called The Month With Miquita, which she hosted on the 4Music channel. She continued to present programmes for T4, such as T4 Movie Special in August 2011.

In November 2011, Oliver filed for bankruptcy after non-payment of a tax bill.   In December 2013 she presented the programme  Young, British and Broke: The Truth about Payday Loans on BBC Three.  She said that her own experiences of bankruptcy made her passionate about making the show.

Oliver's godmother is Casualty actress Amanda Mealing.

Oliver was a part of the four-part BBC TV series 24 Hours in the Past, along with Colin Jackson, Alistair McGowan, Ann Widdecombe, Tyger Drew-Honey and Zoe Lucker which went out between 28 April and 19 May 2015 on BBC One.

Miquita appeared with her mother Andi Oliver on Celebrity Gogglebox in 2021 and 2022.

Starting on 23 January 2022, BBC television begun broadcasting the series The Caribbean with Andi and Miquita. Miquita and her mother started the series by visiting Antigua. Here they met members of their extended family, reconnected with their Antiguan heritage, and illuminated the island's history and culture.

Fashion
In 2008 Miquita Oliver, along with vinspired, helped launch Fashion Favours, a collection of reworked fashion items, customised by volunteers from around the UK. On 25 September 2008, to promote Fashion Favours, Miquita modelled Prime Minister Gordon Brown's shirt.

On 25 June 2009, Oliver appeared on political talk show This Week to discuss issues relating to fashion and also Speaker John Bercow's decision not to wear the traditional robes, and French President Nicolas Sarkozy's decision to ban the burqa in France.

References

External links

4Music profile

1984 births
Living people
People from Paddington
English television presenters
Black British television personalities
People educated at Holland Park School
English people of Antigua and Barbuda descent